Granite Peak is the highest mountain in both the Santa Rosa Range and Humboldt County, in Nevada, United States.  It is the eighteenth-most topographically prominent peak in the state. The peak is located within the Santa Rosa Ranger District of the Humboldt-Toiyabe National Forest, about 12 miles north of the small town of Paradise Valley and 23 miles southeast of the small town of McDermitt. It is the highest mountain for over 80 miles in all directions.

References

External links

Landforms of Humboldt County, Nevada
Mountains of Nevada